Wisdom Mutasa (born 15 May 1995 in Zimbabwe) is a Zimbabwean footballer.

References

External links
 

Living people
1995 births
Zimbabwean footballers
Zimbabwe international footballers
Association football midfielders
Motor Action F.C. players
F.C. Platinum players
Dynamos F.C. players
Singida United F.C. players
CAPS United players
Black Rhinos F.C. players
Zimbabwean expatriate footballers
Zimbabwean expatriate sportspeople in Tanzania
Expatriate footballers in Tanzania
People from Chitungwiza
Tanzanian Premier League players